= Block & Leviton =

Law firm based in Boston

- Headquarters: Boston, Massachusetts
- Date founded: 2011
- Website: blockleviton.com

Block & Leviton is an American plaintiffs' law firm. The law firm was founded in 2011 by Jeffrey C. Block and Jason M. Leviton and is headquartered in Boston.

== Notable cases ==
In April 2022, Block & Leviton filed a civil lawsuit against Elon Musk, alleging that Twitter shareholders may have suffered losses while Musk was building equity stake in the company. In March 2025, a New York federal court judge ruled that the case could proceed after Musk looked to have the case dismissed.

Block & Leviton attorneys served as lead counsel in the $25 million class action lawsuit over Lyft's 2019 IPO.
